Harpagidia mauricaudella is a moth in the family Gelechiidae. It was described by Oberthür in 1888. It is found in Algeria.

References

Moths described in 1888
Dichomeridinae